Petersburg, or Petersburgh, may refer to:

Places

Australia
Petersburg, former name of Peterborough, South Australia

Canada
Petersburg, Ontario

Russia
Saint Petersburg, sometimes referred to as Petersburg

United States
Peterborg, U.S. Virgin Islands
Petersburg, Alaska
Petersburg, California
 Petersburg, California, former name of Greasertown, California
Petersburg, Delaware
Petersburg, Georgia
Petersburg, Illinois
Petersburg, Indiana
Petersburg, Iowa (disambiguation)
Petersburg, Kentucky (disambiguation)
Petersburg, Boone County, Kentucky
Petersburg, Jefferson County, Kentucky
Petersburg, Michigan
Petersburg Township, Jackson County, Minnesota
Petersburg, Minnesota
Petersburg, Missouri
Petersburg, Nebraska
Petersburg, Cape May County, New Jersey
Petersburg, Morris County, New Jersey
Petersburgh, New York
Petersburg, North Carolina (disambiguation)
Petersburg, North Dakota
Petersburg, Ohio (disambiguation)
Petersburg, Pennsylvania
Petersburg, Tennessee
Petersburg, Texas
Petersburg, Virginia
Petersburg, West Virginia
Petersburg, Wisconsin

Other uses
Petersburg (novel), a 1913 novel by Andrei Bely
Siege of Petersburg, a battle of the American Civil War

See also

 Saint Petersburg (disambiguation)
 Petersberg (disambiguation)
 Peterborough (disambiguation)
 Petrograd (disambiguation)
 Peters (disambiguation)
 Peter (disambiguation)